Bruttiboni, also known as Mandorlati di San Clemente and Brutti ma buoni, is a type of hazelnut or almond-flavoured biscuit made in Prato, Central Italy, and many other cities. The name translates to 'ugly but good'. These cookies are made by incorporating meringue; an egg white and sugar mixture; with roasted chopped nuts. The cookies are crunchy on the outside with a soft texture in the middle. As with many other Italian cookies, their origin is disputed but they have been made since at least the mid-1800s.

In Prato they are often sold with Biscottini di Prato.

See also
 Cantucci
 Almond biscuit
 Macaroon
 List of pastries

References

External links
 Brutti ma buoni

Cuisine of Tuscany
Italian desserts
Italian pastries
Almond cookies